Mathieu Drujon (born 1 February 1983 in Troyes) is a French former road bicycle racer. Drujon retired at the end of the 2013 season, after six years as a professional.

Palmares

2004
 1st, Stage 3, Ronde de l'Isard d'Ariège (U23)
2007
 3rd, Tour de Vendée
2013
 1st, Les Boucles du Sud Ardèche
 4th, Paris–Troyes
 7th, Classic Loire Atlantique
 10th Overall, Tour du Haut Var

References

External links

French male cyclists
1983 births
Living people
Sportspeople from Troyes
Cyclists from Grand Est